Dora Afi Abotsi (born ) is a Ghanaian female weightlifter, competing in the 63 kg category and representing Ghana at international competitions. She competed at world championships, most recently at the 2009 World Weightlifting Championships, and at several Commonwealth Games.

Weightlifting

She won a bronze medal at the 2006 African Weightlifting Championships, competing in the  class, with the medals won by the team qualifying it for the world championships. She had been the only female member of the squad named for Morocco.

Abotsi took part in the 2009 World Weightlifting Championships in Goyang, South Korea, where she finished in 24th and last place in the women's  class among those competitors who completed their lifts. Cameroon's Marie Fegue and Sukanya Kunrit of Thailand were the only two competitors who failed to complete by the snatch and the clean and jerk rounds of the competition. Abotsi's overall score of 142 was over a hundred points lower than the winning score of 246 by Kazakh athlete Maiya Maneza. However, her appearance at the Championships meant that she broke the record for the youngest competitor. She represented Ghana at the 2010 Commonwealth Games in Delhi, India. Competing in the  class, she finished in ninth place in the final with a total score of 169 points, ahead of Prossy Irene Nyanga of Uganda. The gold medal was won by Canadian Christine Girard with a score of 235 points.

Abotsi captained the Ghanaian women's team at the African Weightlifting Championships in November 2013, held in Morocco. She herself won two bronze medals, while a total of 19 medals were won by the six members of both the male and female teams. She was one of the athletes trained by American coach Dr Kyle Calhoum Pierce during his tenure installing a new national coaching scheme for Ghana's weightlifters in 2014. Her improvement under Pierce was noted by Ben Nunoo Mensah, president of the Ghana Weightlifting Federation.

Major results

References

1991 births
Living people
Ghanaian female weightlifters
Place of birth missing (living people)
Weightlifters at the 2010 Commonwealth Games
Weightlifters at the 2014 Commonwealth Games
Commonwealth Games competitors for Ghana